The Moragon Stela is a Spanish two-seat fixed-wing microlight aircraft designed and built Aeromoragan based at Casarrubios del Monte, Spain. The aircraft was supplied as complete or as a kit for amateur construction.

The Stela is a two-seat side-by-side high-wing braced monoplane with a composite structure. It has a fixed tricycle landing gear and can be powered by an  Jabiru 2200 engine or a Rotax 912 or 912S.

Aeromarmi Stella M1 
The Aeromarmi Stella M1 was a light plane made under license in Mexico by Aeromarmi since 2006. It was powered by a Jabiru 3300 flat six piston engine and a Sensenich series Z propeller. However, the few sales and the elimination of the airworthiness certification by the DGAC forced the Mexican company to stop manufacturing the aircraft in 2010.

Specifications

References

Homebuilt aircraft
2000s Spanish civil utility aircraft